An asynclitic birth or asynclitism refers to the position of a fetus in the uterus such that the head of the baby is presenting first and is tilted to the shoulder, causing the fetal head to no longer be in line with the birth canal (vagina). Asynclitic presentation is significantly different from a shoulder presentation, in which the shoulder is presenting first. Many babies enter the pelvis in an asynclitic presentation, and most asynclitism corrects spontaneously as part of the normal birthing process. Persistence of asynclitism can cause problems with dystocia, and has often been associated with cesarean birth. However, with a skilled midwife or obstetrician a complication-free vaginal birth can sometimes, though not necessarily, be achieved through movement and positioning of the birthing woman, and patience and extra time to allow for movement of the baby through the pelvis and moulding of the skull during the birthing process if this is safe in the circumstances.

Where intervention is the safest option in asynclitic birth, Kielland forceps are preferable obstetric forceps used in asynclitic births, for example by their sliding mechanism, availing for more appropriate adjustment of the blades.

See also
Childbirth
Naegele obliquity

References

External links
Malpositions and malpresentations, World Health Organization's  Managing Complications in Pregnancy and Childbirth, A guide for midwives and doctors

Presentations and positions in childbirth
Midwifery
Obstetrics